RF2 may refer to:

 Red Faction II, a 2002 video game
 rFactor 2, a 2013 video game
 Konami RF2 (a.k.a. Konami GT), a 1985 arcade game